Laurent Quintreau is a French writer. He was one of the founders of the now-defunct magazine Revue Perpendiculaire, along with Nicolas Bourriaud, Christophe Duchatelet, Jean-Yves Jouannais, Jacques-François Marchandise, Christophe Kihm and Michel Houellebecq.

His 2008 novel Marge Brute was translated into English as Gross Margin by Polly McLean.   He has also written another novel called Mandalas.

References

21st-century French novelists
French male novelists
Living people
21st-century French male writers
Year of birth missing (living people)